Pachycaecus savanicola is a species of beetle in the family Carabidae, the only species in the genus Pachycaecus.

References

Pterostichinae